Psenuc is a genus of spiders in the family Salticidae. It was first described in 2016 by Prószyński. , it contains 11 species.

Taxonomy
The genus Psenuc was one of a number of new genera erected by Jerzy Prószyński in 2016, largely for species formerly placed in Pseudicius. Prószyński placed these genera in his informal group "pseudiciines", with Pseudicius as the representative genus. In Wayne Maddison's 2015 classification of the family Salticidae, Pseudicius, broadly circumscribed, is placed in the tribe Chrysillini, part of the Salticoida clade of the subfamily Salticinae.

Species
Psenuc comprises the following species:
Psenuc courti (Zabka, 1993) – New Guinea
Psenuc dependens (Haddad & Wesołowska, 2011) – South Africa
Psenuc gyirongensis (Hu, 2001) – China
Psenuc hongkong (Song, Xie, Zhu & Wu, 1997) – China (Hong Kong)
Psenuc manillaensis (Prószyński, 1992) – Philippines
Psenuc milledgei (Zabka & Gray, 2002) – Australia (Western Australia)
Psenuc nuclearis (Prószyński, 1992) – Marshall Is., Caroline Is.
Psenuc originalis (Zabka, 1985) – Vietnam
Psenuc solitarius (Haddad & Wesołowska, 2011) – Namibia, South Africa
Psenuc solomonensis (Prószyński, 1992) – Solomon Is.
Psenuc vesporum (Prószyński, 1992) (type) – Philippines

References

Salticidae
Salticidae genera
Spiders of Asia
Spiders of Africa
Spiders of Australia
Spiders of Oceania